Roberto Kozak (14 May 1942 – 4 September 2015) was an Argentinian naturalized Chilean diplomat and humanitarian of Ukrainian descent, notable for his work to rescue people from the prisons and death squads of the Chilean military dictatorship. Kozak was a recipient of the Order of Bernardo O'Higgins with the rank Grand Cross, Chile's highest honour for non-Chilean civilians. He is called 'Latin America's Schindler' for his help provided to political prisoners after the 1973 Chilean coup d'état.

See also

 Harald Edelstam
 Oskar Schindler

References

1942 births
2015 deaths
20th-century Argentine people
Argentine diplomats
Naturalized citizens of Chile